Vũ Ngọc Đỉnh was a North Vietnamese MiG-21 fighter ace of the Vietnamese People's Air Force's. He flew with the 921st fighter regiment and tied for fourth place amongst Vietnam War fighter aces with six kills (four solo, two shared).

The following kills are credited to him by the VPAF:
 11 July 1966, a USAF F-105D (pilot McLelland)
 30 April 1967, a USAF F-105D (pilot Abbott?)
 19 November 1967, a USAF EB-66 (shared kill with Nguyễn Đăng Kỉnh);
 17 December 1967, a USAF F-105D (pilot Ellis)
 23 February 1968, a USAF F-4D (pilot Gutterson, WSO Donald)
 28 January 1970, a USAF HH-53B (crew Bell, Leeser + 4)

See also
List of Vietnam War flying aces

References

Bibliography
 Toperczer, Istvan, MiG Aces of the Vietnam War, Schiffer Publishing, Ltd., 2015; .

North Vietnamese military personnel of the Vietnam War
Living people
North Vietnamese Vietnam War flying aces
Year of birth missing (living people)